Pavel Vasilievitch Moroz (born 26 February 1987) is a Russian volleyball player of Ukrainian origin, a member of Russia men's national volleyball team and Russian club Fakel Novy Urengoy.

Career

Clubs
In 2013 he went to Lokomotiv Novosibirsk. In April 2015 Moroz extended contract with this club.

Doping suspension
In 2022, he was suspended for an anti-doping rule violation by WADA.

References

External links 
 FIVB profile

1987 births
Living people
People from Chervonohrad
Russian men's volleyball players
Ural Ufa volleyball players
Russian sportspeople in doping cases